Up Holland is a civil parish in the West Lancashire district of Lancashire, England.  It contains 97 buildings that are recorded in the National Heritage List for England as designated listed buildings.  Of these, one is listed at Grade I, the highest of the three grades, four are at Grade II*, the middle grade, and the others are at Grade II, the lowest grade.  The parish contains the village of Up Holland and surrounding countryside.  The oldest surviving structure in the parish is Up Holland Priory, the chancel of which was converted into the nave of the Church of St Thomas the Martyr; both of these are listed.  Most of the other listed buildings are houses, cottages and associated structures, and buildings that are (or originated as) farmhouses and farm buildings.  The Liverpool and Bury Railway Company built a railway through the parish and, associated with this and listed, are two bridges and two tunnel portals.  The other listed buildings include public houses, more churches, a former windmill, schools and colleges, a war memorial and a telephone kiosk.


Key

Buildings

Notes and references

Notes

Citations

Sources

Lists of listed buildings in Lancashire
Buildings and structures in the Borough of West Lancashire